Neolithocolletis pentadesma is a moth of the family Gracillariidae. It is known from Indonesia (Java), Malaysia (Sarawak, Selangor), the Philippines (Luzon) and the Seychelles.

The wingspan is 4.4–5 mm. The ground colour of its forewing is reddish ochreous brown, with a distinct white fasciae and a blackish irregular edging.

The larvae feed on Pterocarpus indicus and Pterocarpus javanicus. They mine the leaves of their host plant. The mine has the form of a flat roundish blotch mine on the underside of the leaf. It is a serious pest on Pterocarpus indicus in Malaysia, often causing heavy defoliations.

References

Lithocolletinae
Moths described in 1919

Moths of Indonesia
Moths of Malaysia
Moths of the Philippines
Moths of Seychelles
Taxa named by Edward Meyrick
Leaf miners